Dodangeh Rural District is in the Central District of Hurand County, East Azerbaijan province, Iran. At the National Census of 2006, its population was 6,394 in 1,372 households, when it was in Hurand District of Ahar County. There were 5,430 inhabitants in 1,502 households at the following census of 2011. At the most recent census of 2016, the population of the rural district was 5,260 in 1,625 households. The largest of its 45 villages was Injar, with 708 people. Hurand District was separated from Ahar County to establish Hurand County.

References 

Rural Districts of East Azerbaijan Province

Populated places in East Azerbaijan Province